Chaw, released in the United States as Chawz, is a 2009 South Korean action-adventure film about a mutant killer pig wreaking havoc on a small mountain town, and the ragtag team of five who set out to stop the beast. The Korean title is pronounced "chow", which means "trap" in Chungcheong dialect.

Plot
The quiet town of Sammaeri near Mount Jiri has been crime-free for a decade until now. Bodies of villagers begin turning up, making the village leaders nervous just ahead of an organic food fair expected to be a financial windfall. Chun Il-man (Jang Hang-sun), whose granddaughter was one of the victims, is sure that a man-killing boar is behind the crimes. He joins forces with detective Shin (Park Hyuk-kwon) and Kim Kang-soo (Uhm Tae-woong), a reassigned cop from Seoul whose mother has gone missing in the woods. With Byun Soo-ryun (Jung Yu-mi), a biologist studying wild animals, and glory-seeking hunter Baek Man-bae (Yoon Je-moon) on the team to fight the giant killer beast, the five start up the mountain to face their enemy.

Cast
Uhm Tae-woong as Police officer Kim Kang-soo
Jung Yu-mi as Byun Soo-ryun
Jang Hang-sun as Chun Il-man
Yoon Je-moon as Baek Man-bae
Park Hyuk-kwon as Detective Shin
Kim Gi-cheon as Village chief
Lee Sang-hee as Head of village police
Go Seo-hee as Deok-gu's "mom"
Park Hye-jin as Kim's mother
Heo Yeon-hwa as Mi-young, Kim's wife
Jung Yoon-min as Officer Park
Ha Sung-kwang as Soo-ryun's researcher seonbae
Jo Moon-yi as President Kwak
Park Chang-ik as Deok-gu
Kong Ho-seok as Old Man in mountain cabin
Ha Yoo-yi as Choon-hwa, Il-man's granddaughter
Moon Jong-hun as Police officer
Nam Sang-baek as Resident 1
Jung Jae-sung as Resident 2
Kwon Bum-taek as Pathologist
Kwon Oh-jin as Cemetery owner
Choi Won-young as Prosecutor

Production
Director Shin Jung-won said his film adopted a typical Hollywood B movie monster narrative to tackle environmental issues, particularly the serious destruction inflicted on Korea's ecology. He said Korea had never had a film dealing with real-life killer creatures like Razorback , Alligator and Anaconda and was "intrigued by the idea of a familiar animal attacking and killing humans and wanted to create something out of this unexpectedness. But most of all, I wanted something funny and unique."

After filming in Seoul, the production crew and the main actors flew to the United States to shoot special effects scenes. The shooting lasted for 40 days in San Francisco. Misunderstandings in interpreting the nuance of a scene or dialogue sometimes arose between the U.S. special effects team and Korean actors due to different cultural backgrounds, but Uhm said, "after the shooting was over, we formed a strong team spirit, as if we battled together in a war."

Release
Chaw was screened Berlin Film Festival's Film Market, afterwards it was released in 15 countries, including Germany, Switzerland, India, Singapore, Thailand, the United States, and Japan. The film was released in South Korea on July 16, 2009.

References

External links
  
 
 
 

2009 films
2000s action adventure films
South Korean action adventure films
Films about pigs
Natural horror films
2000s South Korean films
2000s Korean-language films